Cecilia Pantoja Levi (Tomé, Chile, 21 October 1943), better known simply as Cecilia, is a Chilean singer songwriter, member of the nueva ola music movement.

Cecilia is considered by some critics as the greatest teen star of the mid-1960s and the most prominent and influential act of the nueva ola movement.

References 

1943 births
20th-century Chilean women singers
Chilean singer-songwriters
Living people
Women in Latin music